Andrés Felipe Acosta (born January 19, 1989) is a Colombian football goalkeeper, who currently plays for Llaneros F.C. in the Categoría Primera B.

References

1989 births
Living people
Footballers from Bogotá
Colombian footballers
Millonarios F.C. players
Alianza Petrolera players
Independiente Santa Fe footballers
Fortaleza C.E.I.F. footballers
Llaneros F.C. players
Categoría Primera A players
Categoría Primera B players
Association football goalkeepers
21st-century Colombian people